Trade unions in Greece include:
GSEE
ADEDY
Kasapi Union
PAME
Greek Trade Union of Cleaners and Housekeepers
Anarcho-Syndicalist initiative Rocinante.

Trade unionists in Greece
Well-known trade unionists in Greece include:
Konstantina Kouneva
Deborah Carlos Valencia

References